The Latécoère 380 was a flying boat airplane built in France in 1928 for use on Aéropostale's mail routes to South America. The plane later saw military service as a maritime patrol aircraft.

It was a conventional flying boat design with a parasol wing braced to sponsons on the fuselage sides, and two engines mounted in a tandem push-pull pair. A second mail plane was constructed soon afterwards, with the three military examples following in 1934.

Variants
 Latécoère 380 - mailplane version (2 built)
 Latécoère 381 - maritime patrol version (3 built). Armed with twin 7.5 mm Darne machine guns in three positions, and 300 kg (660 lb) of bombs on underwing racks.

Unbuilt variants
 Latécoère 382 - tandem Hispano engines, weights and performance similar to Latécoère 381.
 Latécoère 383 - 'Un Hydravion d'exploration', with reduced span and wing area and four 350 hp Gnome-Rhône 7Kd engines mounted fore and aft of the wing in tandem pairs. The cabin was enlarged and fitted out as living quarters.
 Latécoère 383 bis - The Latécoère 383 fitted with Latécoère 381 wings.
 Latécoère 384 - The designation of the Latécoère 383 fitted with four 350 hp Hispano-Suiza 9Qa engines.
 Latécoère 384 bis - The designation of the Latécoère 383 bis fitted with four 350 hp Hispano-Suiza 9Qa engines.
 Latécoère 385 - The designation of the Latécoère 383/4 fitted with three 500 hp Gnome-Rhône 9Kbr engines, two tractor and one pusher in wing mounted nacelles.
 Latécoère 386 - The designation of the Latécoère 381 fitted with three 700 hp Gnome-Rhone 14Kbr engines, two tractor and one pusher in wing mounted nacelles.

Operators
 
 Aéronavale
 Escadrille 3E3 (Saint-Raphaël, 1934)
 Aéropostale

Specifications (Laté 380)

References

 
 aviafrance.com
 Уголок неба

1930s French mailplanes
Flying boats
3
Twin-engined push-pull aircraft
Parasol-wing aircraft
Aircraft first flown in 1930